USS Butte may refer to:

, was a  commissioned in 1944, and used in the "Operation Crossroads" atomic bomb tests after World War II, and was finally scuttled in 1948.
She was transferred from the Navy to the Military Sealift Command in 1996, and after her retirement from service, she was sunk as a target in 2006.

United States Navy ship names